Zekri is a surname. Notable people with the surname include:

Karim Zekri (born 1985), Egyptian footballer
Mohamed Zekri (born 1985), Egyptian footballer
Noureddine Zekri, Algerian footballer
Talaat Zekri (born 1945), Chairman & CEO of Zekri Group & Zekri Tours Former Honorary Consul of Estonia in Cairo-Egypt 2001–2008